The Additional Paternity Leave Regulations 2010 (SI 2010/1055) are a statutory instrument involving UK labour law, which introduced a basic right for mothers to transfer their right to unpaid leave to their partner if the mother has returned to work.

Contents
The main provisions of the regulations are as follows.

r 4, the employee must have (2) worked for 25 weeks and have the main responsibility, with the mother, for caring for the child (5) the mother must be entitled to maternity leave, pay or an allowance and have returned to work
r 5, right arises between 20 and 52 weeks after birth, for a period of continuous leave between 2 and 26 weeks, after 8 weeks notice.
r 6, notice, an employee declaration of intent to care, a mother declaration that she has returned to work must be given. (3) the employer can require the birth certificate and the mother’s employer’s contact details.
r 7, variation before leave begins
r 8, employer confirmation
r 9, commencement
rr 10-13, rights on mother’s death.

See also

Child care in the United Kingdom
Tax Credits and Child tax credit, Working tax credit
Additional Statutory Paternity Pay (Weekly Rates) Regulations 2010 (SI 2010/1060) r 2, the same statutory rate to maternity leave of [£128.73] applies.

Notes

References
Helene Mulholland, ‘Fathers to get six months’ paternity leave’ (28 January 2010) The Guardian.

External links

United Kingdom labour law
2010 in British law
Parental leave in the United Kingdom
2010 in labor relations
Paternity in the United Kingdom